The Men's sprint at the 2011 UCI Para-cycling Track World Championships was held on March 13.

48 athletes participated in the contest. After the qualifying heats, the fastest 8 riders advanced to the Quarterfinals.

The first rider in each quarterfinal advanced to the semifinals and the 4 losing athletes raced for 5th-8th place.

Results

Qualifying

Quarterfinals

Race for 5th-8th Places

Semifinals

Finals

See also
2011 UCI Track Cycling World Championships – Men's sprint

References

Sprint
UCI Para-cycling Track World Championships – Men's sprint